Cuesta-Rey (originally  'La flor de Cuesta-Rey'  and still printed on the box) is a brand of handmade cigar, founded in 1884 by Angel LaMadrid Cuesta and Peregrino Rey. Cuesta, a Spaniard, had apprenticed in cigar making in Cuba before he met Rey. They formed the company in the Ybor City district of Tampa, Florida to make 'clear Havana' cigars (cigars made in the United States using imported Cuban tobacco). As well as making their own brands they made cigars for other companies such as Nat Sherman.

In 1958, Karl Cuesta, Angel's son sold the company to the J.C. Newman Cigar Co. and since the 1980s they have been produced in the Dominican Republic by Tabacalera A. Fuente.

Current brands
Cabinet Selection
Centenario Coleccion
Centro Fino Sungrown

References
 R.C. Hacker, The ultimate cigar book (2003, 3rd Ed.) 
Perelman's Pocket Cyclopedia of Cigars (2006 Ed.), Richard B. Perelman, 
 Bati, Anwer - "The Cigar Companion" (1997, 3rd Ed., Reprinted: 1998-2000, 2003),

External links
 Historical Images for Cuesta-Rey from the University of South Florida
 http://www.cigarfamily.com

Cigar brands
History of Tampa, Florida
1884 establishments in Florida